Frank Andrew Samblebe (28 January 1915 – 10 October 1986) was an Australian rules footballer who played with Hawthorn in the Victorian Football League (VFL).

Notes

External links 

1915 births
1986 deaths
Australian rules footballers from Victoria (Australia)
Hawthorn Football Club players